The Volkswagen CC, originally marketed as the Volkswagen Passat CC in its first generation, is a variant of the Volkswagen Passat that trades headroom and cargo space for a coupé-like profile and sweeping roofline.  The CC debuted in January 2008, at the North American International Auto Show in Detroit and was discontinued after the 2017 model year.

Volkswagen said the name CC stands for Comfort Coupe, recognizing its combination of a coupe-like profile with four rather than two doors. While based on the Passat, and sharing its wheelbase, the CC is  longer,  lower, and  wider than the Passat.

While the CC has been replaced by the Arteon in most markets, the latter vehicle retains the CC nameplate in China.

Market launch
At its launch in 2008, Volkswagen forecast 300,000 sales over a period of seven years. The automaker expected that 60% of these sales (about 26,000 units per year) will come from the market of the United States. In China, the CC was released by FAW-Volkswagen on July 15, 2010, and was available in 1.8TSI and 2.0TSI trims.

Compared to other midsize sedans in the marketplace, the 2013 Volkswagen CC was evaluated by Edmunds as "attractive and higher quality alternative ... though its smallish backseat and trunk may be deal-breakers ... [and] the sport tuned suspension is on the firm side." Automotive journalists describe the CC sedan's ride as "nearly sports car firm, with every bump and undulation sent directly to your backside."

Specifications

The car has a  wheelbase and was available with a 1.4 L E85 TFSI (Finland and Sweden), 1.8 L petrol inline-four, 2.0 L petrol inline four, a 2.0 L inline four TDI engine in various drivetrain configurations, as well as with a 3.6 L VR6 engine producing  with 4motion four-wheel drive and a six speed Direct-Shift Gearbox transmission.

The North American market had the 2.0T I4 and 3.6 L VR6 engine as options. Manual transmission was available in the 2.0T engine option only. It also came with automatic transmission.

On the European market, the CC was offered with 4MOTION four-wheel-drive on the 2.0 L TDI engines. The  model came with manual transmission and the  model with Direct-Shift Gearbox (DSG). An AdBlue version offering  named BlueTDI was also produced. Availability varied by national markets.

Facelift

A facelift to the CC was presented at the LA Auto Show, and production started in January 2012. The front and rear were revised to make the CC look similar to the then current Volkswagen design, while the midsection was unchanged. Interior changes included a minor updates to the center console along with an updated ACC control panel. This design was also used in the Passat Alltrack.

Features included:
 improved Adaptive Chassis Control (DCC)
 Bi-Xenon headlights with Advanced Front-Lighting System (AFS) curve lights and Dynamic Light Assist glare-free high beams
 fatigue detection system
 Front Assist with "city emergency braking" system
 Side Assist Plus
 Lane Assist
 Rear Assist
 Park Assist
 Traffic sign recognition
 Easy Open

European engine options remain the same as for the 2011 Passat CC. Transmission options were carried over from the previous version, but the diesel automatic transmission now has with a free wheel function that is claimed to reduce fuel consumption by disengaging the clutch, when the driver lifts their foot from the accelerator.

The XDS electronic differential brake that was also used in the Golf GTI was available on the CC as standard or optional equipment. Initially available only in V6 as an AWD alternative, but diesel versions became available during 2012. Availability of diesel 4WD varied by market.

The transmission with the V6 in the North American market was a traditional hydraulic automatic transmission, whereas in other markets, it was a DSG transmission.

Motorsport
A specially-prepared CC was raced in the 2013 British Touring Car Championship season and also in later events. Drivers included Warren Scott, Tom Onslow-Cole, and Aiden Moffat.

Successor

With only 3,900 units sold in 2015, the CC was one of the lowest selling models in the Volkswagen range. 

During November 2016, Volkswagen announced the Arteon would replace the CC. In May 2017, Volkswagen Australia announced the specifications for its new Arteon to replace the discontinued CC at the top end in the car maker's model line up. China would continue production on the CC name starting in August 2018 for the 2019 model year.

Yearly sales

References

External links

 Volkswagen CC official website (archived)

CC
Compact executive cars
Euro NCAP large family cars
Cars introduced in 2008
2010s cars
Front-wheel-drive vehicles
All-wheel-drive vehicles
Cars powered by VR engines
Police vehicles
Mid-size cars
Sports sedans
Touring cars